First Presbyterian Church is a historic Presbyterian church located at Spencer in Tioga County, New York. It is a Gothic Revival style, generally rectangular shaped structure built in 1915. It is constructed of brick with stone trim on a concrete foundation and features a square bell tower at the southwest corner of the building. The interior layout is based upon the Akron plan. It also features 14 stained glass windows designed by Henry Keck of Syracuse, New York.

It was listed on the National Register of Historic Places in 2005.

The building is occupied by Christ the King Fellowship, a congregation of the Presbyterian Church (USA).

References

Churches on the National Register of Historic Places in New York (state)
Presbyterian churches in New York (state)
Gothic Revival church buildings in New York (state)
Churches completed in 1915
20th-century Presbyterian church buildings in the United States
Churches in Tioga County, New York
Akron Plan church buildings
National Register of Historic Places in Tioga County, New York